Hon. Sir Edward Herbert (June 1544  – 23 March 1595) was an English politician and landowner. His aunt, Katherine Parr, was the sixth, and final, wife of King Henry VIII.

Early life
Herbert was born in Hendon, London and was the second son of the William Herbert, 1st Earl of Pembroke and Anne Parr, co-heiress to the barony of FitzHugh through her father and a Gentlewoman of the Chamber to Queen Catherine Howard (fifth wife of King Henry VIII). His elder brother was Henry Herbert, 2nd Earl of Pembroke and his sister, Lady Anne Herbert, married Hon. Francis Talbot, Lord Talbot (the eldest son and heir apparent of George Talbot, 6th Earl of Shrewsbury).

His paternal grandparents were Sir Richard Herbert (a guardian of the young King Edward VI) and the former Margaret Cradock. His maternal grandparents were Sir Thomas Parr and the former Maud Green (a daughter of Sir Thomas Green). His maternal aunt, Katherine Parr, was the sixth, and final, wife of King Henry VIII, and his uncle was ennobled as the 1st Marquess of Northampton.

Career
After receiving his education at Peterhouse, Cambridge, he was returned as a Member of the Parliament of England for Old Sarum from 1562 to 1563. Upon the death of his father in 1569, he inherited the manor of Hendon in Middlesex, also inheriting his mother's lands in Northamptonshire and Westmorland.

Herbert was knighted in 1574 and, in 1587, he purchased the lands of the abeyant barony of Powis from his distant relative, Edward, an illegitimate son of the 3rd Baron Grey of Powis, the direct descendant of the last prince of Powys Wenwynwyn.

Personal life
In 1570, Herbert was married to Mary Stanley, the daughter and heiress of Sir Thomas Stanley, who served as Under-Treasurer of the Royal Mint at the Tower of London during the reign of Queen Elizabeth I. Together, they were the parents of four sons and eight daughters, including:

 William Herbert, 1st Baron Powis (–1655), who married Lady Eleanor Percy, third daughter of Henry Percy, 8th Earl of Northumberland and the former Hon. Catherine Nevill (eldest daughter and co-heiress of John Nevill, 4th Baron Latymer).

Herbert died in 1595 and was buried at St Mary's Church in Welshpool.

References

1544 births
1595 deaths
English MPs 1563–1567
Younger sons of earls